Union for the Homeland and the People was a minor Greek political party that formed in order to take part in 2014 European Parliament Elections. The party was founded by Vyron Polydoras former deputy of New Democracy and Christos Zois, president of New Reformist Radical Reconstruction. The party also cooperated with Christian Democratic Party of the Overthrow, Panagiotis Psomiadis, a former prefect of Thessaloniki and Stelios Papathemelis, a former president of Panhellenic Macedonian Front. Eventually in European parliament elections, the party ranked in 11th place and took 59,341 votes or 1.04% of votes. Famous Greek Romani singer Makis Christodoulopoulos was a candidate in 2014.

Election results

European Parliament

References

External links
 

Defunct political parties in Greece
Conservative parties in Greece
Eastern Orthodox political parties
National conservative parties
Political parties established in 2014
Political parties disestablished in 2015